Technology is a Soviet-Russian synthpop band formed in 1990 by Leonid Velichkovsky, Andrey Kokhaev, and Roman Ryabtsev, former members of the band .

Style and fashion 
The image and sound of the group in the early 1990s: "leather jackets, hairstyles, monochrome synthetics, an impassive romantic voice" – gave rise to a comparison of Technology with the British band Depeche Mode, which was very popular in the USSR. However, according to Velichkovsky, their similarity was due to the laws of style, and the musicians themselves did not copy Depeche Mode.

Members
 Vladimir Nechitaylo – vocals, keyboards at concerts
 Roman Ryabtsev – vocals, guitar, keyboards, music, lyrics, arrangement
 Matvey Yudov – keyboards, backing vocals, music, arrangement

Discography

Studio albums
1991: Vsyo, chto ty khochesh (All that you want)
1993: Rano ili Pozdno (Sooner or later)
1996: Eto Voyna (This is a War)
2009: Nositel Idey (The Carrier of Ideas)

Compilations and remixes
1992: Mne ne nuzhna informatsiya (I don't need the information)
1998: Remiksy (Technology. Remixes)
2001: Luchshie pesni (Technology. Best Songs)
2004: Legendarnye pesni (Technology. Legendary songs)

Singles

Music videos

References

External links 
 
 

Synthpop groups
Russian electronic music groups
Alternative dance musical groups
Russian musical trios
Musical groups from Moscow
Musical groups established in 1990